Horatio Walpole, 3rd Earl of Orford,  (14 June 1783 – 29 December 1858), styled Lord Walpole between 1809 and 1822, was a British peer and politician.

Background
He was the eldest son of Horatio Walpole, 2nd Earl of Orford by his wife Sophia Churchill, a daughter of Charles Churchill by his wife Lady Maria Walpole, a daughter of Robert Walpole, 1st Earl of Orford by his mistress, later his 2nd wife Maria Skerett.  The Countess of Orford was thus granddaughter of Sir Robert Walpole, and brought his line of descent into these related earls. His grandfather, Horatio 1st Baron Walpole of Wolterton was Sir Robert Walpole's brother.

Political career
Orford succeeded his father as Member of Parliament for King's Lynn in 1809, and the held the seat until 1822. The latter year he also succeeded his father in the earldom and entered the House of Lords.

Family
Lord Orford married Mary Wilhelmina Augustine, daughter of William Augustus Fawkener, in 1812. They had several children, including Lady Dorothy Nevill, Lady Rachel Walpole, who married John Savile, 4th Earl of Mexborough, and the Hon. Frederick Walpole. Orford died in December 1858, aged 75, and was succeeded in the earldom by his eldest son, Horatio. Lady Orford died in February 1860.

References

1783 births
1858 deaths
Earls in the Peerage of the United Kingdom
Members of the Parliament of the United Kingdom for English constituencies
Deputy Lieutenants of Norfolk
Fellows of the Royal Society
UK MPs 1807–1812
UK MPs 1812–1818
UK MPs 1818–1820
UK MPs 1820–1826
UK MPs who inherited peerages
Horatio
Lords of the Admiralty
Earls of Orford